Konturen is an interdisciplinary, peer-reviewed journal  dedicated to the analysis of borders, framing determinations, and related figures of delimitation of all kinds.

Konturen prints work that takes into account the contributions of contemporary philosophy and theory to an understanding of problematic discursive places of meeting, overlap, or disjunction. Konturen is published online as one special issue annually, constituted mainly through invited submissions and calls for papers, although the Editorial Board considers unsolicited submissions relevant to the thematic foci of the journal.

History
Konturen was founded in 2008 by Jeffrey S. Librett, Head of the Department of German and Scandinavian at the University of Oregon. The Editorial Board of Konturen comprises Kenneth S. Calhoon (University of Oregon—Department of German and Scandinavian and Program in Comparative Literature), Martin Klebes (University of Oregon—Department of German and Scandinavian) and Alexander Mathäs (University of Oregon—Department of German and Scandinavian). The journal is further supported by an International Board of Editorial Consultants.

2008: Volume I  focuses on Political Theology: The Border in Question.

2009: Volume 2  examines the limits Between Nature and Culture: After the Continental-Analytic Divide.

2010: Volume 3 (forthcoming) explores Borderlines in/of Psychoanalysis.

References

External links
 Konturen website

Political philosophy journals